Rodney Paul Craig (January 12, 1958 – August 17, 2013) was a Major League Baseball outfielder who played for four seasons. Craig was stabbed to death at a homeless encampment in Los Angeles.

Early life
Craig was born in Los Angeles and grew up in the area. He attended Narbonne High School. His teammates said that he was a talented running back, but he quit the football team at Narbonne because he thought that racism was limiting his playing time. He focused on baseball, which he played at San Jacinto College in Texas.

Career
He was signed by the expansion Seattle Mariners organization in 1977. In 1979, he became the first prospect signed by that organization to make it to the major leagues. He played in 16 games for the Mariners that year, and he batted .385. He hit safely in 14 of those 16 games.

In 1980, Craig began the season as a starting outfielder. "Seattle is handing Rodney Craig the right-field job if his tempestuous attitude doesn't ruin him," wrote Peter Gammons that January. After his playing time was limited to 70 games by injuries that season, Craig was traded to the Cleveland Indians for Wayne Cage in March 1981. Craig did not play in the major leagues in 1981, and he appeared in only 49 Indians games in 1982.

Craig spent several more years in the minor leagues, and he last appeared in the major league for ten games with the Chicago White Sox in 1986. He then played in the Mexican League, and he appeared in a few games for the Salinas Spurs of the California League in 1990.

Later life
After leaving baseball, Craig struggled with mental illness and became homeless. After a 2004 fight in which he struck a homeless person with a rock, he was sent to a state psychiatric hospital. On August 17, 2013, Craig got into a fight with two men at an encampment for homeless people in Los Angeles. One of the two men, Billy Morales, had a knife and fatally stabbed Craig. Morales was convicted of second-degree murder on January 15, 2015 and sentenced to 16 years to life in prison for Craig's murder on March 23, 2015.

References

External links
, or Retrosheet
Pura Pelota (Venezuelan Winter League)

1958 births
2013 deaths
2013 murders in the United States
African-American baseball players
Baseball players from Los Angeles
Bellingham Mariners players
Buffalo Bisons (minor league) players
Charleston Charlies players
Chicago White Sox players
Cleveland Indians players
Deaths by stabbing in California
Maine Guides players
Major League Baseball outfielders
Murdered African-American people
Male murder victims
Navegantes del Magallanes players
American expatriate baseball players in Venezuela
People murdered in Los Angeles
Rochester Red Wings players
Salinas Spurs players
San Jose Missions players
Seattle Mariners players
Spokane Indians players
Stockton Mariners players
Deaths from bleeding
Tidewater Tides players
San Jacinto College alumni
20th-century African-American sportspeople
21st-century African-American people
Homeless people